The Online Film Critics Society Award for Best Animated Feature is an annual film award given by the Online Film Critics Society to honor the best animated feature of the year.

History
Toy Story is the only franchise with multiple wins, winning two times for Toy Story 3 (2010) and Toy Story 4 (2019).

Winners

2000s

2010s

2020s

References

Awards for best animated feature film
Lists of films by award
Awards established in 2001